In enzymology, a serine 2-dehydrogenase is an enzyme that catalyzes the chemical reaction

L-serine + H2O + NAD+  3-hydroxypyruvate + NH3 + NADH + H+

The 3 substrates of this enzyme are L-serine, H2O, and NAD+, whereas its 4 products are 3-hydroxypyruvate, NH3, NADH, and H+.

This enzyme belongs to the family of oxidoreductases, specifically those acting on the CH-NH2 group of donor with NAD+ or NADP+ as acceptor.  The systematic name of this enzyme class is L-serine:NAD+ 2-oxidoreductase (deaminating). Other names in common use include L-serine:NAD+ oxidoreductase (deaminating), and serine dehydrogenase.

References

 

EC 1.4.1
NADH-dependent enzymes
Enzymes of unknown structure